22nd BSFC Awards
December 16, 2001

Best Film: 
 Mulholland Drive 

The 22nd Boston Society of Film Critics Awards, honoring the best in film in 2001, were given on 16 December 2001.

Winners

Best Film:
Mulholland Drive
Runner-up: Apocalypse Now Redux
Best Actor (TIE):
Brian Cox – L.I.E.
Denzel Washington – Training Day
Runner-up (TIE): Guy Pearce – Memento and Gene Hackman – The Royal Tenenbaums
Best Actress:
Tilda Swinton – The Deep End
Runner-up: Naomi Watts – Mulholland Drive
Best Supporting Actor:
Ben Kingsley – Sexy Beast
Runner-up: Steve Buscemi – Ghost World
Best Supporting Actress:
Cameron Diaz – Vanilla Sky
Runner-up: Scarlett Johansson – Ghost World
Best Director:
David Lynch – Mulholland Drive
Runner-up: Peter Jackson – The Lord of the Rings: The Fellowship of the Ring
Best Screenplay:
Christopher Nolan – Memento
Runner-up: Terry Zwigoff and Daniel Clowes – Ghost World
Best Cinematography:
Roger Deakins – The Man Who Wasn't There
Runner-up: Christopher Doyle and Mark Lee Ping-bing – In the Mood for Love (Fa yeung nin wa)
Best Documentary:
The Gleaners and I (Les glaneurs et la glaneuse)
Best Foreign-Language Film:
Amores perros • Mexico
Runner-up: In the Mood for Love (Fa yeung nin wa) • Hong Kong/France
Best New Filmmaker:
Michael Cuesta – L.I.E.
Runner-up: Alejandro González Iñárritu – Amores perros

External links
 Past Winners

References
 Boston takes a ‘Drive’  Variety
 Lynch's `Mulholland Drive' wins society's top honor Boston Herald
 BOSTON CRITICS GIVE THUMBS UP TO `MULHOLLAND DRIVE' Boston Globe

2001
2001 film awards
2001 awards in the United States
2001 in Boston
December 2001 events in the United States